Finish is the brand name of a range of dishwasher detergent and cleaning products sold by the consumer products manufacturer Reckitt. The tablets, based on the original product, contain surfactants which counteract water hardness and break down foods containing starches and proteins, and remove bleachable stains and produce enzymes and foams. The product is specially designed for dishwashers. Prior to 2009, the product was known as Electrasol in North America, and as Calgonit in some European countries.

History
In the early 1950s, the increased use of moulded plastic dinnerware posed a number of problems. The Finish brand was created in 1953 by the US company Economics Laboratory (now Ecolab). Taking advantage of research into the needs of the dairy and food industry, the company launched two new products for the household dishwashing machine in 1953: mass-market product Electrasol, and premium product Finish. Later, in 1969, they introduced the first biological powder.

J. A. Benckiser (later Reckitt Benckiser) acquired the Consumer Products division of Ecolab Inc. in 1987. In 1995, the first two-ply powder tablet was introduced, in 1999 the red Powerball capsule, in 2008, the Finish Quantum and the first three-chamber moulded capsule. Circa 2009, all Electrasol products were rebranded under Finish label.

See also
 List of renamed products

References

External links

Detergents
Cleaning product brands
Cleaning product components
Cleaning products
American brands
Reckitt brands
Procter & Gamble brands
Products introduced in 1953